Benjamin Joseph Ottewell (born 23 June 1976) is an English singer-songwriter. He is one of the three lead singers of the English indie rock band Gomez. He was the recipient of the Mercury Music Award Prize in 1998, and is well known for his "deep, raspy voice" and "gravelly baritone". In 2011, Ottewell embarked upon a solo-project, with the debut album Shapes & Shadows.

Career
Ottewell came into contact with Ian Ball (vocals, guitar) while the two were studying law at Sheffield University. Ball was impressed by Ben's big voice, and along with Tom Gray (vocals, guitar, keyboard), Paul Blackburn (bass), and Olly Peacock (drums, synths, computers), they formed the band Gomez. Ottewell's deep, soulful voice has gained him some acclaim and has drawn some comparisons to Pearl Jam's Eddie Vedder and artist Tom Waits, and his lyrical style, and acoustical arrangements, especially in his solo work, have drawn comparisons to folk singer Nick Drake.

Shapes & Shadows
Ben Ottewell's first solo album, Shapes & Shadows, is not a huge departure from his material with Gomez, but it has its differences. It is more low-key, melancholy, and acoustic driven than Gomez. One music critic says "lyrically and thematically, Shapes and Shadows (the album) is a very thoughtful and mature recording, as if Ottewell is taking issues of love and relationships discussed in Gomez's back catalogue to another, more mature level".

Rattlebag
In an interview with Guitar World, Ben revealed "When it came to writing for Rattlebag I started afresh and all the songs were written specifically with the album in mind over a 12-month period, perhaps making the album a little more cohesive. I'm a great believer in the power of the riff, not just in the bombastic Zeppelin sense but also the more cyclical blues or folk licks, and most of the songs are written with a riff as the foundation. Once these ideas were formed, some as just a verse, some almost full songs, I'd take them to Sam [his writing partner, Sam Genders, formerly of English folk band Tunng, now of Diagrams] and we'd finish them. The recording took 5 days in Los Angeles with producer Will Golden, the other key ingredient. We got in some great players and Clay Blair who is a fantastic engineer. It's the most fun I've had in a studio since those early Gomez records." Ben turned to his fanbase to crowdfund the album via Indiegogo.

Personal life
Ottewell was born in Chesterfield and raised in nearby Bonsall, Derbyshire, attending Highfields School in Matlock. He currently resides in Brighton, East Sussex, in England. He is married, and is a father of twin boys and one girl.

Discography

Studio albums
 Shapes & Shadows, 2011
 Rattlebag, 2014 © Tarka Records
 A Man Apart, 2017

Gomez discography

Studio albums

References

1976 births
Living people
English male singer-songwriters
English rock singers
English rock guitarists
English folk singers
English folk guitarists
People from Chesterfield, Derbyshire
People from Bonsall, Derbyshire
21st-century English singers
ATO Records artists
21st-century British male singers